United Nations Security Council Resolution 339 was adopted on 23 October 1973 in order to bring a ceasefire in the Yom Kippur War where Resolution 338 two days before had failed.

The resolution primarily reaffirmed the terms outlined in Resolution 338 (itself based on Resolution 242), returning the forces of both sides back to the position they held when the cease fire (338) came into effect, and a request from the United Nations Secretary-General to undertake measures toward the placement of observers to supervise the cease fire.

The resolution was adopted with 14 votes to none; the People's Republic of China did not participate in the voting.

See also 
 Arab–Israeli conflict
 List of United Nations Security Council Resolutions 301 to 400 (1971–1976)

References
 Text of the Resolution at undocs.org

External links
 

 0339
 0339
Arab–Israeli peace process
October 1973 events
Yom Kippur War